Colus halimeris is a species of sea snail, a marine gastropod mollusk in the family Colidae, the true whelks and the like.

Distribution
Its range is from British Columbia to San Diego, California.

References

 Turgeon, D., Quinn, J. F., Bogan, A. E., Coan, E. V., Hochberg, F. G., Lyons, W. G., Mikkelsen, P. M., Neves, R. J., Roper, C. F. E., Rosenberg, G., Roth, B., Scheltema, A., Thompson, F. G., Vecchione, M., Williams, J. D. (1998). Common and scientific names of aquatic invertebrates from the United States and Canada: mollusks. 2nd ed. American Fisheries Society Special Publication, 26. American Fisheries Society: Bethesda, MD (USA). ISBN 1-888569-01-8. IX, 526 + cd-rom pp.
 Kosyan A.R. & Kantor Yu.I. (2013). Revision of the genus Aulacofusus Dall, 1918 (Gastropoda: Buccinidae). Ruthenica: The Russian Malacological Journal. 23(1): 1-33.

External links
 Dall, W. H. (1919). Descriptions of new species of Mollusca from the North Pacific Ocean in the collection of the United States National Museum. Proceedings of the United States National Museum. 56 (2295): 293-371

Colidae
Gastropods described in 1919